Hea is a genus of cicadas in the family Cicadidae. There are at least three described species in Hea.

Species
These three species belong to the genus Hea:
 Hea choui Lei, 1992 c g
 Hea fasciata Distant, 1906 c g
 Hea yunnanensis Chou & Yao, 1995 c g
Data sources: i = ITIS, c = Catalogue of Life, g = GBIF, b = Bugguide.net

References

Further reading

 
 
 
 

Cryptotympanini
Cicadidae genera